The Legend of Ares or just "Ares Online" is a free 3D, MMORPG game developed by MGame Inc. . Like many 3D MMORPGs, it is a point and click game, where players can attack monsters (PvE) or other players (PvP), pick up items, and talk to NPCs for items and quests.

Story
Ares, Greek god of war, has become resentful of his fellow gods, and wishes to gain more power in order to defeat them. However, the Greek city-states are already warring, and Ares must find new lands in which war can be started. At the same time, the land of Arabic is at a restless peace, with the leaders of both The Holy Empire, and The Religious Alliance ready to break it. Ares travels to Arabic, appearing to Emperor Damion of The Holy Empire as a crow, and incites him to attack the Alliance. Athena, Ares' sister, gains knowledge of this plan, and also travels to Arabic, and informs the native god Kulam of the foreign gods intrusion. Under her guidance, Kulam has intercourse with Aleria, the daughter of Alliance leader Abner.

Gameplay
The game contains two nations which a player can choose to join: the Holy Empire and Religious Alliance. Players can also choose from four separate classes: (Knight, Spearman, Archer and Sorcerer), each with their own skills that are unique to their class. As with most RPGs, the more they play, the stronger they become; players must kill monsters for experience points (EXP) to level up. As a player advances in levels, trouble is bound to occur, not only with stronger monsters, but with players of either country.

Warfare
Every so often, twice a week to be exact, warfare is declared. During warfare, players unite with their countrymen to battle it out against the other nation. Two types of warfare exist. In standard warfares, their team earns points when an enemy dies, an enemy symbol is destroyed, or an enemy catapult is destroyed. In territorial warfare, both nations go against each other in an attempt to destroy the other nations chieftain to control certain areas for added bonuses like cheaper prices for supplies and higher sell rates to npc's. The Warfare Map is relatively simple: One base per nation, separated by a large canyon/gorge. Whenever symbols are destroyed the name of the person who made the last hit on the symbol is announced. The two different warfares have level limits, the first warfare is for 70–119 and the second warfare is for levels 121 and above.

Guilds
Players can form guilds or clans which allow for more social interaction, other people to quest with and the addition of a cape and guild tag. They can also engage in guild wars, involving two guilds fighting each other. When a guild war is declared, the names of the guilds involved are announced.

Shutdown
As of May 2009, the international version of the Legend of Ares was shut down, along with two other games from Netgame.
However the Korean version of Legend of Ares is still running.

The Korean version is also declining due to the decrease in the number of players and lack of progression in the game-play story and may face shut down in the near future.

While the game developers initially revealed plans for the next installment of the game, due to the lack of resources and declining player-base as a whole for the publishers, the plan was officially "Postponed" indefinitely.

The game was republished by RF games (Red Fox games) RF shut down its release of the game on  31 September 2018.

Relaunch

China
Titan Games had Legend Of Ares in 2015-2016 but shut down it services in 2016

But as of Dec.3.2019 Titan Games is relaunching Legend of ares around the End of Dec 2019

North America
Red Fox Games has acquired rights to publish the game in the North America region. And is slated to be launched sometime around July 2016

External links
Legend of Ares Official Site
https://www.playredfox.com/ares
http://ares.ttgames.net/ (Chinese Legend of Ares)

Massively multiplayer online role-playing games
Windows games
Inactive massively multiplayer online games